Kimberly Payne Williams-Paisley (née Williams; born September 14, 1971) is an American actress known for her co-starring roles on According to Jim and Nashville, as well as her breakthrough performance in Father of the Bride (1991), for which she was nominated for several awards, and its sequel, Father of the Bride Part II (1995).
Throughout her acting career, she has guest-starred on TV shows including Tales from the Crypt, George Lopez and Less Than Perfect. She is also known for her roles in made-for-TV movies, including Safe House, The Christmas Shoes, and Lucky 7, and also her role as Laura Parker in Shade, a short film that she also wrote and directed. Williams is married to country musician Brad Paisley, with whom she has two sons; actress Ashley Williams is her sister.

Early life
Williams-Paisley was born in Rye, New York, the daughter of Linda Barbara (née Payne), a fund-raiser, and Gurney Williams III, a health and science writer. She has a sister, Ashley, also an actress, and a brother, Jay. Williams has been in show business since the age of 13. In 1989 she directed the Rye High School Musical Revue. She left Northwestern University during her sophomore year to appear in the 1991 film version of Father of the Bride but returned to complete her degree in drama. While there, she was a sister of the Alpha Phi sorority.

Career
Williams-Paisley's breakthrough role was Annie Banks in Father of the Bride (1991) and Father of the Bride Part II (1995), with Steve Martin and Diane Keaton. She later appeared in Indian Summer (1993), Coldblooded (1995), The War at Home (1996), and in 1996 landed the lead role in the ABC drama series Relativity. She won critical acclaim for her performance, but the series was canceled after 17 episodes due to low ratings. In 2000, Williams-Paisley starred as Virginia in the fantasy miniseries The 10th Kingdom.

From 2001 to 2008, Williams-Paisley played the role of Dana in the ABC sitcom According to Jim, opposite Jim Belushi and Courtney Thorne-Smith. She left the show after its seventh season, but she came back for the show's final episode in 2009. On stage, Williams-Paisley replaced Arija Bareikis as Sunny in The Last Night of Ballyhoo, written by Alfred Uhry (of Driving Miss Daisy fame) sometime later in the play's February 1997 to June 1998 run. During the 2000s, she also starred in number of made for television movies, and also guest starred on Less than Perfect, Boston Legal, and Royal Pains. In film, she starred opposite Matthew McConaughey in 2006 drama We Are Marshall.

In 2012, Williams-Paisley began starring in the recurring role of Peggy Kenter in the ABC drama series Nashville. In December 2015, Williams-Paisley starred in Alvin and the Chipmunks: The Road Chip.

Her mother, Linda, was diagnosed with primary progressive aphasia, which is a form of dementia.  Williams-Paisley is the author of Where the Light Gets In, published on April 5, 2016. The book tells the story of her mother's illness from her diagnosis up until her death. Her mother died in November 2016, seven months after the book was published.

Personal life
On March 15, 2003, Williams married country music singer Brad Paisley. In February 2007, she gave birth to their first child, a son named William Huckleberry Paisley, also known as "Huck," in Nashville, Tennessee, where the family lives. Their second son, Jasper, was born in April 2009.

Filmography

Film

Television

As producer, writer, and/or director

Awards and nominations

References

External links

 
 
 
 Official website of the short film, Shade, directed by Kimberly Williams-Paisley
 Kimberly Williams-Paisley on Twitter

1971 births
20th-century American actresses
21st-century American actresses
Actresses from New York (state)
American film actresses
American stage actresses
American television actresses
American television directors
Television producers from New York (state)
American women television producers
American women screenwriters
Living people
Northwestern University School of Communication alumni
People from Rye, New York
American women television directors
Screenwriters from New York (state)